The Cox Ford Covered Bridge is a covered bridge that crosses Sugar Creek along the western edge of Turkey Run State Park, in Parke County, in the U.S. state of Indiana.

History
Built in 1913 by Joseph A. Britton, the Cox Ford Covered Bridge has a rather unusual distinction as it was built to replace a steel bridge lost in the 1913 flood; the arches used to construction this structure were from the Armiesburg Covered Bridge, built 60 years earlier and also washed out during the 1913 flood.

During the Great Depression, the Cox Ford Covered Bridge received a new coat of paint that was applied by a Works Progress Administration group, and though no historical marker is present, the bridge was listed on the National Register of Historic Places in 1978. It is listed in the 1989 World Guide to Covered Bridges, published by The National Society for the Preservation of Covered Bridges, Inc., as #14-61-34; however, the designation used by Parke County officials is #14-61-36. In the February 1938 Indiana History Bulletin, Robert B. Yule and Richard C. Smith assigned the designation 'sg' to this Covered Timber Bridge located in Section 28, Township 17 North, and Range 7 West, about 1/2 a mile west of Turkey Run State Park.

Gallery

See also
 List of Registered Historic Places in Indiana
 Parke County Covered Bridges
 Parke County Covered Bridge Festival

References

External links

Parke County Covered Bridge Festival

Covered bridges on the National Register of Historic Places in Parke County, Indiana
Bridges completed in 1913
1913 establishments in Indiana
Historic district contributing properties in Indiana
Wooden bridges in Indiana
Burr Truss bridges in the United States
Bridges built by J. A. Britton